Liverpool University Hospitals NHS Foundation Trust is the Trust responsible for managing Aintree University Hospital, Broadgreen Hospital, Liverpool University Dental Hospital and the Royal Liverpool University Hospital.  The new organisation, which has an underlying deficit of around £65 million, was given relatively relaxed performance targets for its first four years, with  significant capital funding, without a private finance initiative contract, to complete the new Royal Liverpool University Hospital, which was left part-built when Carillion collapsed.

History
The Trust was created on 1 October 2019 when the Royal Liverpool and Broadgreen University Hospitals NHS Trust and Aintree University Hospitals NHS Foundation Trust merged.

Services
The Trust delivers a range of services including general hospital services, specialist services, cancer services, dental services and community services. At the time of merger it was reported that there is no plan or desire to close either hospital's emergency department.

References

External links 

 Liverpool University Hospitals NHS Foundation Trust website

NHS foundation trusts
Health in Liverpool